The 2012 European Baseball Championship was an international baseball tournament being held from September 7 to September 16, 2012. The Confederation of European Baseball selected the Netherlands to host the tournament.

Qualification

The following 12 teams qualified for the tournament.

Round 1

Pool A

Standings

Source: www.baseballstats.eu

Schedule

Source: www.baseballstats.eu

Pool B

Standings

Source: www.baseballstats.eu

Schedule

Source: www.baseballstats.eu

Classification games

11th place game

9th place game

7th place game

Source: www.baseballstats.eu

Round 2

Pool C

Standings

Source: www.baseballstats.eu

Schedule

Source: www.baseballstats.eu

Final

Source: www.baseballstats.eu

Final standings

Source: www.baseballstats.eu

References

European Baseball Championship
European Baseball Championship
2012
2012